The following outline is provided as an overview of and topical guide to Google:

Google is an American multinational technology company specializing in internet-related services and products that include online advertising technologies, search, cloud computing, software, and hardware.

Google LLC 
 Motto: "Do the right thing"
 Website: 
CEO: Sundar Pichai
Co-founder: Larry Page
Co-founder: Sergey Brin
Parent company: Alphabet Inc.
 History of Google
 Criticism of Google 
 Censorship by Google
 List of mergers and acquisitions by Google
 Google.org 
 Google platform 
 Googleplex 
 Google logo 
 Google Doodles
 List of Google Easter eggs
 List of Google April Fools' Day jokes

Products

Search

Algorithms:
PageRank
Google Hummingbird
Google Panda
Google Penguin
Related: Google penalty
Analysis:
Google Trends
Google Insights for Search
Knowledge Graph
Google Instant
Google Voice Search
Google Real-Time Search 
Google Personalized Search
Google Web History
Google Custom Search
Related:
Timeline of Google Search
Google Searchology

Maps

Google Traffic
Google Transit
Google Street View
Coverage of Google Street View
Google Street View in Africa
Google Street View in Antarctica
Google Street View in Asia
Google Street View in Israel
Google Street View in Europe
Google Street View in North America
Google Street View in Canada
Google Street View in the United States
Google Street View in Oceania
Google Street View in South America
Google Street View in Argentina
Google Street View in Chile
Google Street View in Colombia
Google Street View privacy concerns
Competition of Google Street View
Google Aerial View
Google Earth
Google Mars
Google Moon
Google Sky
Google Latitude
Google Maps Navigation
Google Maps (app)
Google Map Maker
Google Maps pin

YouTube

History of YouTube
Social impact of YouTube
Censorship of YouTube
Me at the zoo – the first video uploaded onto YouTube

Gmail

Gmail interface
History of Gmail

Chrome

Mobile versions:
Google Chrome for Android
Google Chrome for iOS
ChromeOS
Chrome Web Store
Google Chrome Apps
Google Chrome Extensions
Open-source:
Chromium
ChromiumOS
Google Chrome Frame 
Google Chrome Experiments

Docs Editors

Google Docs
Google Sheets
Google Slides
Google Drawings
Google Forms
Google Sites
Google Keep

Android

Android software development
Android version history
Android Lollipop
Android Jelly Bean
Android 4.0
Derivatives:
Android Wear
Android Auto
Android TV
Android One
List of features in Android
List of Android launchers
Android application package
Android Runtime
Android rooting
Android Studio

Pixel

Chromebook Pixel
Pixelbook
Pixelbook Go
Pixel C
Pixel Slate
Pixel
Pixel 2
Pixel 3
Pixel 3a
Pixel 4
Pixel 4a
Pixel 5
Pixel 5a
Pixel 6
Pixel Buds

History

History of Google
Timeline of Google Search
History of Gmail
History of YouTube
History of Android
Android version history 
History of Google+
History of Google Chrome
History of Google Maps
Timeline of Google Street View
History of Google Docs
History of Blogger
History of Google Buzz

Product release timeline
1998 – Google Search
2001 – Google Groups
2002 – Google News 
2004 – Orkut
2004 – Gmail 
2005 – iGoogle
2005 – Android (acquisition)
2005 – Google Maps
2005 – Google Reader 
2006 – Google Calendar
2006 – Google Docs
2006 – YouTube (acquisition)
2008 – Google Chrome
2010 – Google eBooks
2010 – Google Buzz
2011 – Google+
2012 – Google Drive
2012 – Google Play
2013 – Google Pixel
2019 – Stadia

Product discontinuation timeline
2014 – Orkut
2013 – iGoogle
2013 – Google Reader
2011 – Google Buzz
2011 – Google Notebook 
2011 – Google Desktop
2011 – Google Pack
2019 – Google+
2020 – Google Play Music

Acquisitions 
 See: List of mergers and acquisitions by Google

Criticism

Criticism of Google
Privacy concerns
Copyright issues
Monopoly, restraint of trade, and antitrust
Criticism of products:
Criticism of Gmail
Criticism of Google Buzz

Events

For developers
Google I/O
Google Developer Day
Android Developer Day
Android Developer Challenge
Google Code Jam

Other
Google Science Fair
Google Searchology
Doodle4Google

People in relation to Google

Management

Co-founders 

 Larry Page: Co-founder
 Sergey Brin: Co-founder

Senior leadership 

Sundar Pichai: Chief Executive Officer
Philipp Schindler: Chief Business Officer
Don Harrison: President, Corporate Development
Kent Walker: SVP, Global Affairs
Lorraine Twohill: SVP, Global Marketing

Senior product area leadership 
Hiroshi Lockheimer: SVP, Platforms & Ecosystems
Rick Osterloh: SVP, Devices & Services
Prabhakar Raghavan: SVP, Ads & Commerce
Ben Gomes: SVP, Search, News & Assistant
Jeff Dean: SVP, Google AI
Thomas Kurian: CEO, Google Cloud
Susan Wojcicki: CEO, YouTube
Jared Cohen: CEO, Jigsaw

Product area leadership

Devices & Services 
 Clay Bavor: VP, AR/VR
 Ana Corrales: COO
 Rishi Chandra: VP, Nest
 Sabrina Ellis: VP, Pixel
 Phil Harrison: VP, Stadia
 Ivy Ross: VP, Hardware Design & UX
 Pankaj Sultane: VP, Global IT

Platforms & Ecosystems 
 Matías Duarte: VP, Material Design
 Anil Sabharwal: VP, Photos & Personal Communications
 Sameer Samat: VP, Android & Play
 John Solomon: VP, ChromeOS

Search, News & Assistant 
 Brad Bender: VP, News Products
 Manuel Bronstein: VP, Assistant
 Nick Fox: VP, Search & Assistant Products/UX
 Richard Gingras: VP, News
 Pandu Nayak: VP, Search

Ads & Commerce 
 Catherine Courage: VP, Ads & Commerce UX
 Jerry Dischler: VP, Ads
 Oliver Heckmann: VP, Travel
 Bill Ready: President, Commerce

Google Cloud 
 Robert Enslin: President, Global Customer Operations
 Urs Hölzle: SVP, Technical Infrastructure
 Javier Soltero: VP, Google Workspace
 Amit Zavery: VP, Business Application Platform

AI 
 David Feinberg: VP, Health
 Fernando Pereira: VP, Machine Learning
 Jay Yagnik: VP, Machine Perception

YouTube 
 Robert Kyncl: CBO
 Neal Mohan: CPO
 Scott Silver: VP, Engineering
 Adam Smith: VP, Product Management

Google's influence on language and culture
Google (verb) 
Google bombing 
Googlewhack

References

External links

 
 Official Google Blog

Google
Google
Google